Sajin Baabu (born 1 June 1986) is an Indian film director, screenwriter, and producer, who works in Malayalam cinema. He made his directional debut with Unto the Dusk (Malayalam: അസ്തമയം വരെ or Asthamayam Vare ) in 2014.  He is noted for his latest movie Biriyaani which bagged numerous awards, including the NETPAC award for best film at ASIATICA, Rome, Italy. He is the winner of Special Jury mention for Direction for his movie Biriyaani at the 67th National Film Awards

Personal life
Sajin Baabu was born in a remote village called Koopu in Thiruvananthapuram.

Filmography

References

Malayalam film directors
Malayalam screenwriters
1986 births
Living people